The Modesto Nuts are a Minor League Baseball team of the California League and the Single-A affiliate of the Seattle Mariners. They are located in Modesto, California, and are named for the several types of nuts grown in the region. They play their home games at John Thurman Field, which opened in 1955.

The Nuts adopted their current name in 2005 after the team's affiliation with the Oakland Athletics ended. Before then, the team was known as the Modesto Athletics (or A's) from 1975 to 2004. The club was also known as the Modesto Reds (1966–1974 and 1946–1961) and Modesto Colts (1962–1964).

History
On June 2, 2006, manager Chad Kreuter resigned to become the head baseball coach of the University of Southern California.  Kreuter replaced his father-in-law, Mike Gillespie. As of 2012, the club is managed by Lenn Sakata who replaced the winningest coach in Modesto Nuts history Jerry Weinstein who was promoted to the Colorado Rockies at the conclusion of the 2011 season.

In spring 2008, the team was the subject of Bush League TV's short internet video "Bush League 101: How to Bush League a Bush League Baseball Team."

On June 21, 2011, the Modesto Nuts hosted the 2011 California/Carolina All Star Smash.

In 2012, Greg Young was replaced by Alex Margulies who did play-by-play for all home and away games from 2012–2013, and Modesto Bee sports writer Brian VanderBeek did color commentary in the middle innings of most home games. Keaton Gillogly has been doing play-by-play since 2014.  The play-by-play position was formerly held by Joshua Suchon, who now works for the Los Angeles Dodgers.

On September 1, 2012, Modesto Nuts 1st Basemen Jared Clark hit his 24th Home Run of the season against the San Jose Giants making him the Modesto Nuts single season Home Run leader passing former Nuts outfielder Kent Matthes, who in 2011 set the old record with 23 Home Runs in the season.

As of 2011, the Modesto Nuts have set their attendance record for five straight seasons and have been honored as Back to Back California League Organization of the Year for 2010 and 2011.

Following the 2016 season, the Seattle Mariners purchased a majority share of the Nuts, and the teams entered into a player development contract making Modesto a Mariners affiliate. HWS Baseball IV, LLC, continues to see to the team's day-to-day operations.

The Nuts won the California League championship for 2017, sweeping both the Division Series and the League Series and winning nine games in a row dating back to the last three games of the regular season. This was the Nuts' ninth league title and the first as part of the Mariners organization.

In conjunction with Major League Baseball's restructuring of Minor League Baseball in 2021, the Nuts were organized into the Low-A West where they continued as a Mariners affiliate at the Low-A classification. In 2022, the Low-A West became known as the California League, the name historically used by the regional circuit prior to the 2021 reorganization, and was reclassified as a Single-A circuit.

On May 11th, 2022 the Seattle Mariners named Veronica Hernandez as General Manager, the first female GM in team history. Additionally, Hernandez is the first Latina GM in minor league baseball history

Mascots

The Modesto Nuts have three mascots: Al the Almond, Wally the Walnut and Shelley the Pistachio.

Roster

Notable alumni

Baseball Hall of Fame alumni
 Sparky Anderson (1967, MGR) Inducted, 2000
 Rollie Fingers (1966) Inducted, 1992
 Rickey Henderson (1977) Inducted, 2009
 Reggie Jackson (1966) Inducted, 1993
 Tony LaRussa (1966) Inducted, 2014
 Joe Morgan (1963) Inducted, 1990
 Ted Simmons (1968) Inducted, 2020

Notable alumni
 Nolan Arenado (2011) 6 x MLB All-Star
 Tony Batista (1994) 2 x MLB All-Star
 Charlie Blackmon (2009, 2016) 2 x MLB All-Star; 2017 NL Batting Title
 Mike Bordick (1987, 1995) MLB All-Star
 Tom Burgmeier (1962–1963)
 Pedro Borbon (1968)
 Jose Canseco (1984) 6 x MLB All-Star; 1986 AL Rookie of the Year; 1988 AL Most Valuable Player
 Ron Coomer (1988) MLB All-Star
 José Cruz (1968) 2 x MLB All-Star
 Nelson Cruz (2004) 5 x MLB All-Star
 John Denny (1972) 1976 NL ERA Leader; 1983 NL Cy Young Award
 Corey Dickerson (2012, 2015) MLB All-Star
 Dave Duncan (1966) MLB All-Star
 Jermaine Dye (2002) MLB All-Star; 2005 World Series Most Valuable Player
 Andre Ethier (2004) 2 x MLB All-Star
 Dexter Fowler (2007) MLB All-Star
 Bob Forsch (1969–1970)
 Mike Gallego (1981, 1985)
 Jason Giambi (1993) 5 x MLB All-Star; 2000 AL Most Valuable Player
 Kevin Gregg (1998)
 Ben Grieve (1995–1996) MLB All-Star; 1998 Rookie of the Year
 Von Hayes (2004, MGR) MLB All-Star
 Jay Howell (1986) 3 x MLB All-Star
 Rick Honeycutt (1991) 2 x MLB All-Star; 1983 AL ERA Leader
 Al Hrabosky (1969)
 Hisashi Iwakuma (2017) MLB All-Star
 Matt Keough (1975) MLB All-Star
 Darren Lewis (1989)
 Ryan Ludwick (2000) MLB All-Star
 Bake McBride (1970–1971) MLB All-Star; 1974 NL Rookie of the Year
 Mark McGwire (1984–1985) 12 x MLB All-Star; 1987 Rookie of the Year
 Willie Montanez (1968) MLB All-Star
 Dwayne Murphy (1975, 1986)
 Miguel Olivo (2000)
 Joe Rudi (1966) 3 x MLB All-Star
 Dick Stuart (1951) MLB All-Star
 Nick Swisher (2003) MLB All-Star
 Kevin Tapani (1986–1987)
 Miguel Tejada (1996) 6 x MLB All-Star; 2002 AL Most Valuable Player
 Mickey Tettleton (1981–1983, 1985–1987) 2 x MLB All-Star
 Troy Tulowitzki (2005, 2008) 5 x MLB All-Star
 Lee Walls (1951) MLB All-Star
 Walt Weiss (1985, 1989) MLB All-Star; 1988 AL Rookie of the Year
 Brad Ziegler (2004)

References

External links
 
 Statistics from Baseball-Reference

Professional baseball teams in California
 01
California League teams
Sports in Modesto, California
Baseball teams established in 1946
1946 establishments in California
Colorado Rockies minor league affiliates
St. Louis Cardinals minor league affiliates
Oakland Athletics minor league affiliates
Houston Astros minor league affiliates
New York Yankees minor league affiliates
Atlanta Braves minor league affiliates
Pittsburgh Pirates minor league affiliates
Baltimore Orioles minor league affiliates